Vahid Abasov (born 6 June 1997 in Stavropolsky District, Russia) is a Russian-born Serbian boxer. He participated at the 2022 European Amateur Boxing Championships, being awarded the gold medal in the welterweight event. Abasov and Artjom Agejev were the only people to win medals which were gold medals for their country. He was the second person of his country to win the medal.

References

External links 

Living people
Serbian male boxers
Welterweight boxers
1997 births